The Swallow Boathouse is a historic boathouse on Lake Winnipesaukee in central New Hampshire, United States. It is located in a cove on the west side of Moultonborough Neck, in the town of Moultonborough. Built in 1908-10, it is one of the state's most architecturally elaborate boathouses, exhibiting elements of the Tudor Revival and Shingle style.  Now used exclusively by the association owners, it was listed on the National Register of Historic Places in 1980.

Description and history
The Swallow boathouse is located on the west side of Moultonborough Neck, a long finger of land extending into Lake Winnipesaukee, New Hampshire's largest lake. It is set in Kona Bay, an inlet bounded on the north by Swallow Point and the south by Wallace Island. Land access to the boathouse is private via Kona Farm Avenue and Windward Avenue. The structure and neighborhood surrounding it is owned by a private association and is only accessible by water to the general public for viewing. A crib of heavy timbers forms its base, with three structural bays topped by an expansive gambrel roof, with cupolas on each section. A portion of the interior, originally open to the water, has been floored over.

The boathouse was designed by Harry J. Carlson and built in 1908-10. The walkway was originally sheltered by a roof; that covering and a matching land pavilion have been removed due to storm damage. The boathouse was built to house the Swallow, a large seagoing yacht that was transported to the lake by rail by Herbert Dumaresque, owner of the Kona Farm estate on which the boathouse was located. Its size is more reminiscent of boathouses used for commercial operations, and Carlson appears to have based its design on an 1830s boathouse at the Portsmouth Naval Shipyard, elaborating it architecturally with Shingle and Tudor features.

See also
National Register of Historic Places listings in Carroll County, New Hampshire

References

Transportation buildings and structures on the National Register of Historic Places in New Hampshire
Shingle Style architecture in New Hampshire
Tudor Revival architecture in New Hampshire
Buildings and structures completed in 1908
Transportation buildings and structures in Carroll County, New Hampshire
National Register of Historic Places in Carroll County, New Hampshire
Boathouses on the National Register of Historic Places
Moultonborough, New Hampshire
1908 establishments in New Hampshire